Guggenheim may refer to:

Buildings
 Guggenheim Building, in Rochester, Minnesota
 Guggenheim Museums, global network of museums established by the Solomon R. Guggenheim Foundation
 Murry Guggenheim House, also known as the Guggenheim Library of Monmouth University, Monmouth County, New Jersey

People
 Charles Guggenheim (1924–2002), American film director and producer
 Davis Guggenheim (born 1963), American film director and producer
 Edward Guggenheim (1901-1970), English physical chemist
 Marc Guggenheim (born 1970), American television writer-producer and writer for Marvel Comics and DC Comics
 Peggy Guggenheim (1898-1979), American art collector, founder of the Guggenheim Collection in Venice

Other uses
 Guggenheim (surname), including a list of people with the name
 Guggenheim Exploration Company, notable for Beatty v. Guggenheim Exploration Co.
 Guggenheim family, an American family of Swiss Jewish ancestry
 Guggenheim Fellowship, an American grant awarded by the John Simon Guggenheim Memorial Foundation
 Guggenheim Partners, a financial services firm
 "Guggenheim", a song on the 2012 album Sounds from Nowheresville by The Ting Tings
 John Simon Guggenheim Memorial Foundation, founded in 1925
 Solomon R. Guggenheim Foundation, founded in 1937
 Martin Guggenheim, a character in the Amazon Prime video original Mozart in the Jungle
 Guggenheim, a variant of the word game Categories